Karl Johann Nikolaus Stumpff (May 17, 1895 – November 10, 1970) was a German astronomer. The Stumpff functions, used in the universal variable formulation of the two-body problem, are named after him.

Works 
 Analyse periodischer Vorgänge. Gebrüder Borntraeger: Berlin 1927
 Grundlagen und Methoden der Periodenforschung. Berlin 1937
 Ermittlung und Realität von Periodizitäten. Korrelationsrechnung. In: Handbuch der Geophysik. 1940
 Tafeln und Aufgaben zur Harmonischen Analyse und Periodogrammrechnung. Berlin 1939
 Neue Theorie und Methoden der Ephemeridenrechnung. Abhandlungen der Deutschen Akademie der Wissenschaften 1947
 Neue Wege zur Bahnberechnung der Himmelskörper. In: Fortschritte der Physik. vol.1, 1954, pp. 557–596
 Geographische Ortsbestimmungen. In: Hochschulbücher für Physik. Berlin 1955
 Himmelsmechanik. 3 vols., Deutscher Verlag der Wissenschaften, Berlin 1959, 1965, 1974
 Die Erde als Planet. 1939, 1955
 Das Uhrwerk des Himmels. Stuttgart 1942, 1944
 Neuauflage und Bearbeiter von Littrow Wunder des Himmels. Bonn 1963
 Fischer Lexikon Astronomie. 1957, 1972
 Astronomie gegen Astrologie. 1955

References

External links
 

20th-century German astronomers
1895 births
1970 deaths